The 2004 Tour of the Basque Country was the 44th edition of the Tour of the Basque Country cycle race and was held from 5 April to 9 April 2004. The race started in Bergara and finished in Lazkao. The race was won by Denis Menchov of the Illes Balears–Banesto team.

General classification

Notes

References

2004
Bas